Boris Silovich Brechko (Russian: Борис Силович Бречко; 7 December 1910 – 8 July 1987) was a Russian rower who represented the Soviet Union. He competed at the 1952 Summer Olympics in Helsinki with the men's coxed four where they were eliminated in the semi-final repechage.

References

1910 births
1987 deaths
Soviet male rowers
Olympic rowers of the Soviet Union
Rowers at the 1952 Summer Olympics
European Rowing Championships medalists